Aung Thein Lin (also spelled Aung Thein Linn) is a Burmese politician, and a member of parliament at the Pyithu Hluttaw from the South Okkalapa constituency. The former brigadier general in the Myanmar Army was mayor of Yangon from 2000 to 2010. He was a major in the military in 1988 and later became the commander of Light Infantry Division 101 and then deputy minister of Industry-2 as well as an executive of the junta’s mass organization, the Union Solidarity and Development Association (USDA), which was transformed into the Union Solidarity and Development Party in April 2010.

References

Burmese military personnel
Union Solidarity and Development Party politicians
Mayors of Yangon
People from Yangon
Members of Pyithu Hluttaw
1952 births
Living people
Defence Services Academy alumni
Specially Designated Nationals and Blocked Persons List
Individuals related to Myanmar sanctions